Thermistis xanthomelas is a species of beetle in the family Cerambycidae. It was described by Holzschuh in 2007. It is known from China.

References

Saperdini
Beetles described in 2007